Impala, in comics, may refer to:

 Impala (DC Comics), a superhero affiliated with the Global Guardians
 Impala (Marvel Comics), a mercenary supervillain

See also
 Impala (disambiguation)